Ryan Connolly (born February 25, 1982) is YouTuber that hosts the web show Film Riot.

Early life
Connolly attended the technical school Full Sail University.

Film Riot
The first episode was released on May 27, 2009. As of July 2020, the Film Riot YouTube channel has over 1.6 million subscribers. The show has seen a steady decline in viewership and engagement since 2015.

Other channels
 "Film State," a canceled show for movie news.
 Pimp Your Production, an internet series created/ produced by Eric Kessler.

YouTube Shorts
Connolly runs Triune Films, an independent YouTube company in Rowlett, Texas. The name “Triune” is a nod to the Holy Trinity in Christianity. Through it, he has released multiple shorts, with no intention of ever releasing a feature film after 14 years of having a YouTube channel.

References

External links
 
 Film Riot on YouTube

American film directors
American male screenwriters
Living people
1982 births